The ship of fools is an allegory, originating from Book VI of Plato's Republic, about a ship with a dysfunctional crew. The allegory is intended to represent the problems of governance prevailing in a political system not based on expert knowledge.

Benjamin Jowett's 1871 translation recounts the story as follows:

The concept makes up the framework of the 15th-century book Ship of Fools (1494) by Sebastian Brant, which served as the inspiration for Hieronymus Bosch's painting, Ship of Fools: a ship—an entire fleet at first—sets off from Basel, bound for the Paradise of Fools. In it, Brant conceives Saint Grobian, whom he imagines to be the patron saint of vulgar and coarse people. In literary and artistic compositions of the 15th and 16th centuries, the cultural motif of the ship of fools also served to parody the "ark of salvation", as the Catholic Church was styled.

References 

English phrases
Political metaphors
Works by Plato
Fictional ships

la:Navis stultorum
no:Narrenes skip